Tomás Carbonell and Francisco Roig were the defending champions, but did not participate this year.

Gustavo Kuerten and Fernando Meligeni won in the final 6–2, 6–2, against Andrea Gaudenzi and Filippo Messori.

Seeds

  Libor Pimek /  Byron Talbot (first round)
  Donald Johnson /  Francisco Montana (first round)
  Hendrik Jan Davids /  Menno Oosting (first round)
  Marius Barnard /  Piet Norval (first round)

Draw

Draw

External links
 Draw

Portugal Open
1997 ATP Tour
Estoril Open